Wassmuth (German: Waßmuth) is a German surname. Notable people with the surname include:

Anton Wassmuth (1844–1927), Austrian physicist
Conny Waßmuth (born 1983), German sprint canoer
Tabea Waßmuth, German footballer

See also
Wasmuth (disambiguation)

German-language surnames